Orcopampa District is one of fourteen districts of the province Castilla in Peru.

See also 
 Machuqucha
 Sawsi
 Waman Quri
 Waqrawiri

References

Districts of the Castilla Province
Districts of the Arequipa Region